Tulumba Department is a department of Córdoba Province in Argentina.

The provincial subdivision has a population of about 12,211 inhabitants in an area of 10,164 km², and its capital city is Villa Tulumba.

Settlements
Churqui Cañada
El Rodeo
Las Arrias
Lucio V. Mansilla
Rosario del Saladillo
San José de La Dormida
San José de Las Salinas
San Pedro Norte
Villa Tulumba

Departments of Córdoba Province, Argentina